Hisham Zreiq (born 9 February 1968 in Nazareth), also spelled Zrake, is a Palestinian Christian-Israeli Independent filmmaker, poet, animator and visual artist. He began working in computer art in 1994, and in 1996 started exhibiting his work in galleries and museums.
In 2007 he filmed his first documentary, The Sons of Eilaboun, and in 2008 he created the short film Just Another Day, dealing with the life of Arabs living in western world after September 11 terror attacks.  He uses his poetry and visual art in his films, as in Just Another Day, and was a member of the Culture Unplugged film festival panel. In 2018 Zreiq contributed to the book An Oral History of the Palestinian Nakba by writing a chapter based on the interviews from his documentary The Sons of Eilaboun.

Early life
Zreiq was born in Nazareth, the son of Lydia Zreiq (née Dubayah), an elementary school teacher, and Salem Zreiq, a history high school teacher; both were Palestinian Eastern Orthodox Christians. He has two sisters and two brothers. Zreiq is married and has one son.

Zreiq studied computer science and mathematics, and works as a software architect. In March 2001 he moved to Germany, where he lives and works.

Film career
In 2006 Hisham Zreiq started producing/directing films starting with the documentary ‘The Sons of Eilaboun’, that won Al-Awda Award in Palestine, followed by the short fiction film ‘Just another day’ (2009), a film that deals with the Arabs in the western world after September 11 attacks. In 2010/2011 he produced the short fiction ‘Before you is the Sea’, a film about the Middle East peace process in a form of a love story between a Jewish woman and a Palestinian man. In 2021 Zreiq finished a short animated film ‘Don't Cry’ that was selected for the Al Ard Film Festival the 18th-edition.

Filmography
The Sons of Eilaboun (2007, Documentary film)
Just Another Day (2008 film)
Before you is the sea (2011, Short film)
Don't Cry (Animated Short Film) (2022, Short animated film)

Awards and honors
In 2004 Hisham Zreiq was one of the winners of the award "Kunst- und Förderpreis Sparkasse Bayreuth", and his work was exhibited at Kunst & Museum  Hollfeld.

After the premiere screening of his first film "The Sons of Eilaboun" in Nazareth, Hisham Zreiq was honored by Ramiz Jaraisy, the mayor of Nazareth, and by Dr. Hana Sweid, an Israeli Arab politician and member of Knesset from Eilaboun. Ramiz Jaraisy described the film as an important work which tells the Palestinian story in a contrast with the dominant Israeli version. His film won the Al-Awda award in Palestine 2008, and in April 2012 Hisham Zreiq was chosen to be the artist of the month in the magazine This Week in Palestine. 
Some of Zreiq's works were featured in the book ArtWanted.com Creative Minds 
His animated short film Don't Cry won over 20 awards

Awards
 Kunst- und Förderpreis Sparkasse Bayreuth (2004),  Hollfeld, Germany 
 Best documentary, Al-Awda award (2008), Ramallah, Palestine 
 Best short animation, Best Istanbul Film Festival (2022), Istanbul, Turkey
 Best Creative (Short film), International Halicarnassus Film Festival (2022), Bodrum, Turkey
 Best Animation, Sweet Democracy Film Awards (2022), Rome, Italy 
 Best Animation, New York Neorealism Film Awards (2022), Rome, Italy 
 Best Animated Film, Stanley Film Awards (2022), London, United Kingdom
 Award of Recognition: Animation, IndieFEST Film Awards (2022), La Jolla, CA, USA 
 Award of Recognition: Direction, IndieFEST Film Awards (2022), La Jolla, CA, USA 
 Award of Recognition: Animation, Accolade Global Film Competition (2022), La Jolla, CA, USA 
 Award of Recognition: Film Short, Accolade Global Film Competition (2022), La Jolla, CA, USA 
 Best Animated Short Film, Triloka International Filmfare Awards (2022), Wellington, Tamil Nadu, India
 Best Director, Triloka International Filmfare Awards (2022), Wellington, Tamil Nadu, India
 Best Animation Director,  Mumbai Entertainment International Film Festival (2022), Mumbai, India
 Honorable Mention , Mannheim Arts and Film Festival (2022), Mannheim , Germany

Official Selections
His films were screened in several festivals and events, such  as:

 Sixth Annual International Al-Awda Convention 2008, California, United States 
 Boston Palestine Film Festival 2008, United States 
 International İzmir Short Film Festival 2008, Izmir, Turkey
 Amal The International Euro-Arab film Festival 2008, Spain 
 Carthage Film Festival  2008 (Palestine: To remember section), Carthage, Tunisia
 Regards Palestiniens, Montreal, Canada 
 Chicago Palestine Film Festival, 2009
 13th Annual Arab Film Festival, 2009
 Sixth Twin Cities Arab Film Festival, Minnesota, USA  
 Salento International Filem Festival, 2010, Italy 
 Palestine Film Festival in Madrid, 2010, Spain  
 18th Damascus International Film Festival, 2010, Syria 
 Al Ard Doc Film Festival, 2011, Cagliari, Italy 
 Toronto Palestine Film Festival, 2012, Toronto, Canada
 Al Ard Film Festival the 18th-edition, 2022, Cagliari, Italy 
 Madrid Indie Film Festival • MADRIFF 2022, Madrid, Spain

Non-film activities
Zreiq is a software architect and learned his trade in Israel at the Technion and Haifa University, and worked for almost 10 years in Israel in hi-tech companies.
Zreiq Wrote a chapter for the history book An Oral History of the Palestinian Nakba based on the interviews from his documentary The Sons of Eilaboun.

See also
The Sons of Eilaboun (Documentary film)
Just Another Day (2008 film)
Before you is the sea (film)
Don't Cry (Animated Short Film) (2022, Short animated film)
Palestinian Christians

References

External links
 Hisham Zreiq's Art Gallery
 
 Hisham Zrake's Premiere Artist Portfolio
 Hisham Zrake's ArtWanted Portfolio
 Hisham Zrake's onefineart Portfolio
 When it all began a documentary film by Hisham Zreiq
 The Sons of Eilaboun a documentary film by Hisham Zreiq
 Just another day a film by Hisham Zreiq
 Before you is the sea a film by Hisham Zreiq

1968 births
Living people
Palestinian film producers
Palestinian screenwriters
Arab screenwriters
People from Nazareth
Palestinian poets
Arab citizens of Israel
Digital artists
German-language film directors
Israeli film directors
Arabic-language film directors
Palestinian documentary film directors
People from Erlangen
Film directors from Bavaria
Arabs in Germany
Israeli Arab artists
Palestinian contemporary artists